Hany Abubakr Mukhtar (born 21 March 1995) is a German professional footballer who plays as an attacking midfielder for Nashville SC in Major League Soccer.

Club career

Hertha BSC
Mukhtar began playing football at a very early age, initially for FC Stern Marienfelde. He was recruited into the youth academy of then-Bundesliga club Hertha BSC at the age of only seven. Rising through Hertha's ranks, he captained the club's U-17 squad to a Championship title in 2012. The following season, he joined Hertha's reserves, and was surprisingly called to the first team when Israeli international Ben Sahar missed a match for Yom Kippur. In the final minute of the match against Dynamo Dresden, Mukhtar came on as a substitute for Ronny, making him the second youngest professional debutant in Hertha's history.

Benfica
On 15 January 2015, Mukhtar signed for Portuguese champions Benfica until 2020. The transfer fee was believed to be €500,000 and Hertha BSC would allegedly participate in a potential resale. On 10 April 2015, Mukhtar debuted for the reserve team and scored a goal in a home draw against Chaves (2–2) in Segunda Liga. On 23 May, he played his first match for the first team, as a substitute in a home win against Marítimo (4–1) in their last league match of the season.

On 28 August 2015, he joined Austrian Red Bull Salzburg on a season-long loan deal. Salzburg were also granted a subsequent transfer option.

Brøndby
For the following season he was again loaned, this time to Danish club Brøndby IF. On 24 July 2016, he made his Danish Superliga debut by replacing Andrew Hjulsager for the final fifteen minutes of a 2–0 away win over Silkeborg IF. On 21 August, he scored his first goal for Brøndby in a 7–0 away rout over AGF.

On 17 April 2017, Brøndby exercised their option to sign Mukhtar permanently from Benfica. Mukthar penned a four-year contract with Brøndby which tied him to the club until the summer 2021.

On 22 April 2018, Mukhtar was awarded the Superliga Player of the Season, with him being named on the Superligaen Team of the Year by newspaper B.T. On 10 May 2018, Mukhtar played as Brøndby beat Silkeborg IF 3–1 in the Danish Cup final.

Nashville SC
On 27 August 2019, Mukhtar became the first designated player in Nashville SC franchise history. Although the transfer became official in August 2019, he remained at Brøndby IF until 1 January 2020. On 12 September 2020, Mukhtar scored his first goal for Nashville in a 2–1 win over Atlanta United FC.

On 17 July 2021, Mukhtar scored the first hat trick in Nashville SC history over Chicago Fire FC. This was the fastest hat trick from the start of a game in MLS history; Mukhtar scored in the 10th, 13th and 16th minutes.

On 1 November 2022, Mukhtar was named the 2022 Landon Donovan MLS MVP after receiving 48.03% of total votes. Mukhtar led the league with 34 goal contributions (23 goals, 11 assists) in 2022, tied for the fifth-most in a single MLS season.

International career
A German youth international, Mukhtar scored the only and winning goal for the Germany U19 national team in the 2014 UEFA European Under-19 Championship final against Portugal. On 1 June 2015, he scored a hat-trick for Germany's under-20 in an 8–1 win against Fiji in his first match at the FIFA U-20 World Cup.

Personal life
Mukhtar was born in Berlin, Germany, to a German mother (Ursula) and a Sudanese father. He has one elder brother. He is engaged to Ashley Gowder.

Career statistics

Club

Style of play
Mukhtar is a versatile attacking midfielder who is known for his technical abilities, creativity, and vision on the pitch. He is particularly adept at finding gaps in the opposition's defense and exploiting them with his quick turns and sharp changes of direction. He is also a good passer of the ball, with an eye for threading through balls and defense-splitting passes to his teammates.
In addition to his attacking qualities, Mukhtar is also a hard-working player who is always willing to track back and help out his team defensively when needed. He is a good dribbler and can create scoring opportunities for himself and his teammates with his excellent ball control.

Honours
Hertha BSC
2. Bundesliga: 2012–13

Benfica
Primeira Liga: 2014–15

Red Bull Salzburg
Austrian Bundesliga: 2015–16
Austrian Cup: 2015–16

Brøndby
Danish Cup: 2017–18

Germany U19
UEFA Under-19 Championship: 2014

Individual
2014 UEFA European Under-19 Championship: Team of the Tournament
MLS Best XI: 2021, 2022
MLS Golden Boot: 2022
MLS All-Star: 2022
MLS Player of the Month: August 2022
MLS Most Valuable Player: 2022

References

External links

 
 
 
 

1995 births
Living people
German people of Sudanese descent
Footballers from Berlin
German footballers
Association football midfielders
Hertha BSC II players
Hertha BSC players
S.L. Benfica B players
S.L. Benfica footballers
FC Red Bull Salzburg players
Brøndby IF players
Nashville SC players
2. Bundesliga players
Bundesliga players
Liga Portugal 2 players
Primeira Liga players
Austrian Football Bundesliga players
Danish Superliga players
Designated Players (MLS)
Major League Soccer players
Germany youth international footballers
Germany under-21 international footballers
German expatriate footballers
German expatriate sportspeople in Portugal
German expatriate sportspeople in Austria
German expatriate sportspeople in Denmark
German expatriate sportspeople in the United States
Expatriate footballers in Portugal
Expatriate footballers in Austria
Expatriate men's footballers in Denmark
Expatriate soccer players in the United States